The 2017 All-Ireland Under-21 Hurling Championship was the 54th staging of the All-Ireland Under-21 Hurling Championship since its establishment by the Gaelic Athletic Association in 1964. The championship began on 24 May 2017 and ended on 9 September 2017.

Waterford entered the championship as the defending champions, however, they were defeated by Cork in the Munster semi-final. Meath fielded a team in the championship for the first time in several seasons.

On 9 September 2017, Limerick won the championship following a 0-17 to 0-11 defeat of Kilkenny in the All-Ireland final. This was their fifth All-Ireland title overall and their first in two championship seasons.

Provincial championships

Leinster Under-21 Hurling Championship

Preliminary round

Quarter-finals

Semi-finals

Final

Munster Under-21 Hurling Championship

Quarter-final

Semi-finals

Final

Ulster Under-21 Hurling Championship

Semi-finals

Final

All-Ireland Under-21 Hurling Championship

All-Ireland Semi-Finals

All-Ireland final

Championship statistics

Top scorers

Top scorers overall

Top scorers in a single game

Miscellaneous
 The All-Ireland final between Kilkenny and Limerick is the first ever championship meeting between the two teams.

References

Under-21
All-Ireland Under-21 Hurling Championship